Lje (Љ љ; italics: Љ љ)  is a letter of the Cyrillic script.

Compare Latvian ⟨ļ⟩, Slovak ⟨ľ⟩, Portuguese ⟨lh⟩, Spanish ⟨ll⟩ and Italian ⟨gl⟩.

Lje is a ligature of ⟨л⟩ and ⟨ь⟩. It was invented by Vuk Stefanović Karadžić for use in his 1818 dictionary, replacing the earlier digraph ⟨ль⟩. It corresponds to the digraph  in Gaj's Latin alphabet for Serbo-Croatian.

It is today used in Macedonian, variants of Serbo-Croatian when written in Cyrillic (Bosnian, Montenegrin and Serbian), and Itelmen.

It was also once used in the Udege language.

Related letters and other similar characters
Л л : Cyrillic letter El
Ь ь : Cyrillic letter Soft sign
Ll : Spanish double L in the absence of Yeísmo
Ľ ľ : Latin letter L with caron - a Slovak letter
Ĺ ĺ : Latin letter L with acute - another Slovak letter
Ļ ļ : Latin letter L with cedilla - a Latvian letter
Ly  : Hungarian ly
Њ њ : Cyrillic letter Nje

Computing codes

References

External links

Audio samples of the letter Lje

Cyrillic ligatures
Serbian letters